Zajączków may refer to the following places in Poland:
Zajączków, Lower Silesian Voivodeship (south-west Poland)
Zajączków, Łódź Voivodeship (central Poland)
Zajączków, Lublin Voivodeship (east Poland)
Zajączków, Świętokrzyskie Voivodeship (south-central Poland)
Zajączków, Masovian Voivodeship (east-central Poland)